
Dick Tracy is a comic strip.

Dick Tracy may also refer to:
Dick Tracy (character), lead character from Dick Tracy comic strip

Radio and television
Dick Tracy (radio series)
The Dick Tracy Show
Dick Tracy (TV series)

Film
Dick Tracy (serial)
Dick Tracy (1945 film)
Dick Tracy (1990 film)
Dick Tracy Meets Gruesome
Dick Tracy vs. Cueball
Dick Tracy's Dilemma

Music
Dick Tracy (orchestral score)
Dick Tracy (song)
Dick Tracy (soundtrack)

Other
Dick Tracy (video game)
Richard Tracey, British politician